"Us" is a song recorded by English singer-songwriter James Bay, from his second studio album, Electric Light (2018). The song was released by Republic Records on 30 March 2018 as the third single off the album.

Background and release
Bay told Entertainment Weekly: "I've been lucky enough to meet people all over the world and witness the phenomenal strength of crowds. I wrote this song to explore unity and inclusion. Looking through the lens of my own personal relationships, this song turned out to be a particularly important moment on the album for me."

The song was re-released as a duet with Alicia Keys on 22 May 2018.

Music video
The official music video to accompany the release of "Us" was directed by Bryan Schlam and first released on YouTube on 18 April 2018, through James Bay's official YouTube account.

Throughout the clip, Bay plays piano in an empty room. The visuals cycle through intimate shots of ordinary life: one person stares into a bathroom mirror, another reclines in the grass next to sprinklers, eats at a diner, daydreams in church. The video ends with the diverse cast united for the camera, emphasizing the title "Us" with the words "me", "you", "them", "him" and "her" crossed out.

Reception
Ruth Kiane from Entertainment Weekly said: "The guitar-led track is more mellow than up-tempo second single "Pink Lemonade" and electro-inspired album lead "Wild Love" its smooth lyrics and sultry notes fit well into the singer's oeuvre. "I believe in something, I believe in us," sings Bay, which is reminiscent of his work on his debut Chaos and the Calm.

Live performances

 The Voice (American season 14)

Track listing

Charts

Certifications

Release history

References

2018 singles
2018 songs
Republic Records singles
James Bay (singer) songs
Songs written by James Bay (singer)
Song recordings produced by Paul Epworth